Pogononeura is a genus of plants in the grass family. The only known species is Pogononeura biflora, native to Uganda and Tanzania.

References

Chloridoideae
Monotypic Poaceae genera